The 1959 San Francisco 49ers season was the team's tenth season in the NFL, and were coming off a 6–6–0 record in 1956, however, they ended without qualifying for the playoffs. After starting the season 6–1, they lost 4 out of their last 5 games and ended with a 7–5 record.

Top players
The season was good for Y. A. Tittle, as he completed 51.3% of his passes for 1331 yds and 10 touchdowns. Tommy Davis scored the most points, 67 out of the team's total of 255.

Offseason

Draft

Schedule

Standings

References

External links
1959 San Francisco 49ers season stats

San Francisco 49ers seasons
San Francisco 49ers